"The Oxen" is a poem (sometimes known by its first line, "Christmas Eve, and Twelve of the Clock") by the English novelist and poet Thomas Hardy (18401928). It relates to a West Country legend: that, on the anniversary of Christ's Nativity, each Christmas Day, farm animals kneel in their stalls in homage. It was first published in December 1915, in the London newspaper The Times. It has been set to music several times.

Musical settings 
These include (in date order, where known):

 1919Graham Peel (18781937), for voice and piano
 1920Edward Joseph Dent (18761957), for voice and piano
 192122Gerald Finzi (190156), for voice and orchestra, as the third piece in his song cycle By Footpath and Stile, Op. 2
 1927Leslie Cochran, for voice and piano
 1945Robert Fleming (192176), for medium voice and piano
 1951Armstrong Gibbs (18891960), for voice and piano
 1954Ralph Vaughan Williams (18721958), for baritone and orchestra, No. 7 in his cantata Hodie 
 1954Robert Williams, for unison chorus and piano
 1958Richard K. Winslow (born 1918), for SATB chorus and piano or organ
 1963William Reginald Pasfield (190994), for unison chorus and piano
 1967Alan Rawsthorne (190571), for mixed chorus a cappella
 1968Benjamin Britten (191376), for SA chorus and piano
 1991Jonathan Rathbone, a capella, for the SATB popular group The Swingle Singers
 2009Derek Holman (born 1931), as "Christmas Eve", for voice and piano, No.2 in his The Four Seasons
 Jonathan Elkus (born 1931), for high voice and piano

References 

Poetry by Thomas Hardy
1915 poems
Christmas poems